is a former Japanese football player.

Playing career
Takada was born in Narashino on July 26, 1973. After graduating from high school, he joined Yokohama Flügels in 1992. He became a regular player as defender and defensive midfielder from first season. The club won the champions 1993 Emperor's Cup and 1994–95 Asian Cup Winners' Cup. However his opportunity to play decreased from 1995 season. In 1997, he moved to newly was promoted to J1 League club, Vissel Kobe. However he could hardly play in the match. Through Tokyo Fulie in 1998, he joined new club Yokohama FC was founded by Yokohama Flügels supporters in 1999. He played many matches and the club won the Japan Football League (JFL) champions for 2 years in a row (1999-2000). The club was also promoted to J2 League from 2001. In 2002, he moved to JFL club Sony Sendai and played until 2005. In 2006, he moved to Regional Leagues club Shizuoka FC and retired end of 2006 season.

Club statistics

References

External links

yfc.unofficial.jp

1973 births
Living people
People from Narashino
Association football people from Chiba Prefecture
Japanese footballers
J1 League players
J2 League players
Japan Football League players
Yokohama Flügels players
Vissel Kobe players
Yokohama FC players
Sony Sendai FC players
Association football defenders